The 2012 CONCACAF Under-17 Women's Championship was the third edition of the U-17 women's championship in football for the CONCACAF region. It was held in Guatemala City from May 2 to 12.

The three best-placed teams qualified for the 2012 FIFA U-17 Women's World Cup held in Azerbaijan. Canada were the defending champions from 2010. All matches were played on artificial turf at the Estadio Cementos Progreso.

Qualified teams

The qualification process for the 2012 tournament started on 14 August 2011.

Squads

Group stage
All times are local (UTC−06:00).

Tie-breaking criteria
Teams were ranked on the following criteria:

1. Greater number of points in matches between the tied teams
2. Greater goal difference in matches between the tied teams (if more than two teams finish equal on points)
3. Greater number of goals scored in matches among the tied teams (if more than two teams finish equal on points)
4. Greater goal difference in all group matches
5. Greater number of goals scored in all group matches
6. Drawing of lots

Group A

Group B

Knockout stage
All times are local (UTC−06:00).

The winners of the two semifinal matches and the winner of the third place match qualified for the 2012 FIFA U-17 Women's World Cup, held in Azerbaijan.

Semi-finals

Third place match

Final

Winners

Goalscorers
12 goals
 Summer Green

6 goals
 Summer Clarke

5 goals
 Valérie Sanderson
 Luz Duarte

3 goals

 Jessica Morales
 Margaret Purce

2 goals

 Jasmin Dhanda
 Nichelle Prince
 Kayla Gray
 Mariana Cadena
 Hallie Hernández
 Laurie Batista
 Marta Cox
 Karla Riley
 Emily Bruder
 Toni Payne
 Andi Sullivan

1 goal

 Elissa Neff
 Amanda Pierre-Louis
 Vivian Herrera
 Paula Ibarguen
 Khadija Shaw
 Cynthia Pineda
 Vivian Vega
 Yassiel Franco
 Morgan Andrews
 Joanna Boyles
 Darian Jenkins
 Amber Munerlyn
 Sarah Robinson

References

External links
 Official Site
Tournament and qualification on soccerway.com

 
2008
Women's
2012
2012 in women's association football
2012 in American women's soccer
2012 in Canadian women's soccer
2011–12 in Mexican football
2012 in Bahamian sport
2011–12 in Jamaican football
2011–12 in Panamanian football
2011–12 in Trinidad and Tobago football
2011–12 in Guatemalan football
2012 in youth association football